Welcome Reverend is a 1950 Italian crime film comedy directed, written by and starring Aldo Fabrizi. It co-stars Massimo Girotti and Lianella Carell.

Cast

Aldo Fabrizi as  Don Peppino
Lianella Carell as Anna
Massimo Girotti
Gabriele Ferzetti
Giovanni Grasso
Mario Mazza
Virginia Balestrieri
Pitto as  The child (as il piccolo Pitto)
Ada Colangeli
  Franco Fava
Lia Grani
Marianne Hold
Alfredo Leggi
Amerigo Santarelli
Carlo Titta
Raimondo Van Riel

External links 
 

1950 films
1950s Italian-language films
Italian black-and-white films
Italian crime comedy films
1950s crime comedy films
Films directed by Aldo Fabrizi
1950 comedy films
1950s Italian films